Böðvildr, Beadohild, Bodil or Badhild was a princess, the daughter of the evil king Níðuðr/Niðhad/Niðung who appears in Germanic legends, such as Deor, Völundarkviða and Þiðrekssaga. Initially, she appears to have been a tragic victim of Wayland the smith's revenge on her father, but in later Scandinavian versions, she becomes Wayland's wife and the mother of the hero Viðga of the Þiðrekssaga and medieval Scandinavian ballads.

Deor
Although preceded by the Ardre image stone, the oldest surviving textual source on her is the 10th century Anglo-Saxon poem Deor. It deals with the fact that Wayland has just murdered her brothers and raped her. It is suggested by the poet that things will turn out bad for her:

Völundarkviða

In Völundarkviða, she appears when her father Níðuðr has captured Wayland, and she receives from her father a gold ring that the smith had made for his lost Valkyrie lover. Wayland is hamstrung and put to work in her father's smithy.

Wayland has revenge by murdering her brothers and hiding them in the smithy. He then set their skulls in silver and sent them to the king together with jewelry for the queen made by the boys' eyes. For Böðvildr he made a brooch of the boys' teeth.

Böðvildr visited Wayland's smithy to ask him to mend a broken ring. Then, he raped her and flew away in a feather construction he had made, leaving her crying with shame:

Wayland, then flies to her father telling him of his revenge. The sorrow stricken king asks his thrall to go and fetch his daughter and Böðvildr has to tell her father the gruesome truth mirroring the tragedy told of in Deor:

Þiðrekssaga
The 13th century Þiðrekssaga has a fuller account in prose.

Wayland sailed to Denmark in a hollowed tree and eventually arrived to Jutland, where king Niðung was reigning. Wayland was soon challenged by Niðung's smith Amilias. Amilias forged a suit of armour and Wayland a sword, Mímung, with which he easily killed his rival. He thus gained great fame as a smith.

At the eve of a battle, Niðung found out that he had forgotten his victory stone and offered Böðvildr and half of his kingdom to the one who would get it before sunset. Wayland fetched the stone but, when he came back, the king's dróttseti (seneschal) asked for it. Wayland refused to give it up and killed the knight. Niðung banished him.

Later he tried to avenge himself by poisoning the king and Böðvildr but he got caught, was hamstrung and set to work in the forge. But he eventually killed Niðung's two younger sons in his smithy and made a whole set of tableware for the king with their bones. He also raped Böðvildr.

Wayland's brother Egill came at the court. He was a famous archer and Niðung challenged him to shoot an apple from the head of his son. He could shoot only one arrow, but took three. After he succeeded with his first arrow, the king asked him what the other two were for, and he explained that had he hit his son, he would have shot the king with the others.

Wayland asked his brother to collect feathers, with which he made himself wings. He flew to Niðung and revealed to him that he had killed his sons and made his daughter pregnant. He then flew away. Egill was ordered by the king to shoot him down. But Wayland had tied a bladder filled with blood under his arm. Egill hit it, thus deceiving the king, and Wayland returned to Zealand.

Niðung died shortly after and his son Otvin succeeded him. The princess gave birth to a son called Viðga. Wayland settled a peace agreement with Otvin and he married Böðvildr, as they both had agreed before his leaving.

Toponyms 

In England, a Burial Mound apparently existed on The Berkshire Downs, which according to local legend was Beadohilde's Barrow. The mound has now disappeared, but was excavated in 1850 when a jet ornament, a Kimmeridge ring and a bronze pin were recovered.

Notes and references

External links
Austin Simmons, The Cipherment of the Franks Casket (PDF) Beadohilde is twice depicted on the front side of the Franks Casket.

Medieval legends
Legendary Norsemen
Old English poems
Mythological princesses